The men's pole vault at the 2022 World Athletics Championships was held at the Hayward Field in Eugene on 22 and 24 July 2022.

Summary

The script was written 15 years before 2020 Olympic Champion and World Record holder Armand Duplantis was born. At the time, Sergey Bubka was the dominant pole vaulter. He would go to meets offering large bonuses for a world record, or a major championship. Step 1) get the feel of the runway while the other competitors max out. 2) set the bar to one centimeter above the world record. 3) fly over the bar. 4) collect the money and go home. During that period, Armand's father and coach (along with his mother Helena), Greg Duplantis was sometimes one of those other vaulters, watching. Years later, Yelena Isinbayeva made a career of doing the same thing. The world never got to articulate how good these athletes were at their best, only how good they needed to be to collect the bonus.

There was a $100,000 bonus for setting a World Record at these Championships. It took 5.75m to get into the final. There, 7 got over 5.80m with Duplantis and 2012 Olympic Champion / former World Record holder Renaud Lavillenie both passing. At 5.87m it was down to 7, with Duplantis and Chris Nilsen missing their first attempts, putting first attempt clearance by Ernest John Obiena and 2016 Olympic Champion Thiago Braz into a tie for the lead. At 5.94m, Duplantis and Nilsen cleared on their first attempts to take back the lead after Obiena missed his first attempt before clearing on his second to improve his own Asian record. Braz missed his first two and passed to try to make one last attempt at 6 metres. Duplantis cleared 6 with ease, the others had maxed out, Nilsen left with silver, Obiena bronze. Competition over, next Duplantis had to deal with records, first the Championship record, formerly 6.05m by Dmitri Markov from 2001. He flew over that one. With his name cemented into the record book, the next step, a big step, was the World Record. His first time down the runway, it wasn't right. He aborted the remains of the attempt going under the bar. On his second attempt, he flew over the bar. It was time to celebrate, collect the medal and the paycheck. Duplantis took no further attempts.

The World Record bettered his own world record set indoors by winning the Indoor World Championships on the same script.  It also bettered his own outdoor world record of 6.16m set at the BAUHAUS-galan meet in Stockholm less than a month earlier.

Records
Before the competition records were as follows:

Qualification standard
The standard to qualify automatically for entry was 5.80 m.

Schedule
The event schedule, in local time (UTC−7), was as follows:

Results

Qualification 
The heats will start on 22 July at 17:05. Qualification: 5.80 m (Q) or at least 12 best performers (q).

Final 
The final was started on 24 July at 17:25.

References

Pole vault
Pole vault at the World Athletics Championships